Frank Louis Oliver (April 15, 1922 – February 1, 2018) was an American politician who was the Democratic member of the Pennsylvania House of Representatives, representing the 195th District from a special election on November 15, 1973. until retiring from the House on November 30, 2010.

Oliver announced that he was retiring, after 37 years in the Pennsylvania House. He died in 2018 at the age of 95.

Ward Leader
Oliver was the Ward Leader of the 29th Ward Democratic Executive Committee in Philadelphia.

References

External links
Pennsylvania House of Representatives - Frank Louis Oliver official PA House website
Project Vote Smart - Representative Frank L. Oliver (PA) profile
Follow the Money - Frank L. Oliver
2006 2004 2002 2000 1998 campaign contributions
Pennsylvania House Democratic Caucus - Rep. Frank L. Oliver official Party website

Democratic Party members of the Pennsylvania House of Representatives
1922 births
2018 deaths
Politicians from Philadelphia
African-American state legislators in Pennsylvania
20th-century African-American people
21st-century African-American people